Mihai Bravu is a metro station in Bucharest. It is named after the road underneath which is built. It serves the residential areas of Vitan, northern Tineretului and Bârzeşti. The station was opened on 28 December 1981 as part of the second phase of Line 1 between Timpuri Noi and Republica.

References

Bucharest Metro stations
Railway stations opened in 1981
1981 establishments in Romania